The 1987 Buffalo Bills season was the franchise's 18th season in the National Football League, and 28th overall.

On October 31, 1987, the Los Angeles Rams traded Eric Dickerson to the Indianapolis Colts in a three team trade involving the Bills. The Rams sent Dickerson to the Colts for six draft choices and two players. Buffalo obtained the rights to Cornelius Bennett from Indianapolis. Buffalo sent running back Greg Bell and three draft choices to the Rams, while Indianapolis added Owen Gill and three of their own draft picks to complete the deal with the Rams. Adding Bennett to the team helped to form the nucleus for a strong young defensive unit that would become the core of Buffalo's later Super Bowl teams.

Offseason

NFL draft

Buffalo's first two draft picks—linebacker Shane Conlan and defensive back Nate Odomes—would later go on to make to have a great deal of impact on Buffalo's defense. Conlan was named 1987 Defensive Rookie of the Year and would be selected to three consecutive Pro Bowls in the 1988, 1989 and 1990 seasons. Odomes would be selected to consecutive Pro Bowls in 1992 and 1993.

Another impactful rookie, Cornelius Bennett, was drafted by Indianapolis in 1987, before being traded to Buffalo.

Personnel

Staff

NFL replacement players
After the league decided to use replacement players during the NFLPA strike, the following team was assembled:

Roster

Regular season
Cornerback Nate Odomes was the youngest starting defensive player in the NFL. It was also his rookie season.

Schedule

Note: Intra-division opponents are in bold text.

Game summaries

Week 2

Week 6

Week 7

Week 8 

 Cornelius Bennett’s first game as a Buffalo Bill, wearing #55.
 Steve Tasker blocked punt just before halftime resulting in a safety and 18–0 halftime score.

Week 9

Week 11 vs Dolphins

Week 12

Week 15

Standings

Player stats

Passing
Note: Comp = Completions; ATT = Attempts; TD = Touchdowns; INT = Interceptions

Rushing

Receiving

Defense
Note: FR = Fumble Recoveries; TCKL = Tackles; INT = Interceptions; TD = Touchdowns

Special teams
Note: FGA = Field Goals Attempted; FGM = Field Goals Made; FG% = Field goal percentage; XPA = Extra Points Attempted; XPM = Extra Points Made; XP% = Extra points percentage

Punting

Awards and honors
Defensive Rookie of the Year
 Shane Conlan

Pro Bowl Most Valuable Player
 Bruce Smith

References

External links
 1987 Buffalo Bills at Pro-Football-Reference.com

Buffalo Bills seasons
Buffalo Bills
Buff